Pseudoperma is a genus of longhorn beetles of the subfamily Lamiinae, containing the following species:

 Pseudoperma chalcogramma (Bates, 1887)
 Pseudoperma patruelis (Breuning, 1940)

References

Onciderini